Bansjore is a village in the Bansjore CD block in the Simdega subdivision of the Simdega district in the Indian state of Jharkhand.

Geography

Location
Bansjore is located at

Area overview
In the area presented in the map alongside, “the landscape is formed of hills and undulating plateau” in the south-western part of the Chota Nagpur Plateau. About 32% of the district is covered with forests (mark the shaded portions in the map.) It is an overwhelmingly rural area with 92.83% of the population living in the rural areas.  A major portion of the rural population depends on rain-fed agriculture (average annual rainfall: 1,100-1,200 mm) for a living.

Note: The map alongside presents some of the notable locations in the district. All places marked in the map are linked in the larger full screen map.

Civic administration

Police station
There is a police station at Bansjore.

CD block HQ
The headquarters of Bansjore CD block are located at Bansjore village.

Demographics
According to the 2011 Census of India, Bansjor had a total population of 4,282, of which 2,166 (51%) were males and 2,094 (49%) were females. Population in the age range 0–6 years was 555. The total number of literate persons in Bansjor was 2,292 (61.50% of the population over 6 years.

(*For language details see Bansjore block#Language and religion)

Education
S.S. High School is a Hindi-medium coeducational institution established in 1957. It has facilities for teaching in class VI to class X. The school has a playground and a library with 576 books.

References

Villages in Simdega district